Ferocactus wislizeni, the fishhook barrel cactus, also called Arizona barrel cactus, candy barrel cactus, and Southwestern barrel cactus, is a species of flowering plant in the cactus family Cactaceae, native to northern Mexico and the southern United States. It is a ball-shaped cactus eventually growing to a cylindrical shape, with spiny ribs and red or yellow flowers in summer.

Some sources mistakenly spell the epithet "wislizenii." The correct spelling is with one "i," per ICN article 60C.2.

Characteristics
The common name comes from the spines, which are thick and hooked. It has a leathery asparagus green cortex (skin) with approximately 15-28 ribs per cactus. Its flowers are yellow to red-orange and appear atop the cactus fruit during the summer months. The fruits are green when unripe, yellow after the flower dries up, and persist atop the cactus long after the flower is gone, sometimes for more than a year.

In adulthood, fishhook barrel cacti generally lean southward, toward the sun, earning them the nickname "compass barrel cactus."  One theory about why this happens is, the afternoon sun is so intense it slows the growth on the exposed side, causing the plant to grow unevenly. Older barrels can lean so far they uproot themselves and fall over, especially after heavy rains when the soil is loose. Its life cycle is 50–100 years.

Like Sclerocactus, Ferocactus typically grows in areas where water flows irregularly or depressions where water can accumulate for short periods of time. They are not associated with washes and arroyos but rather grow along rocky ridges and open bajadas.

The "fishhook" spines and the armored web of spines enclosing the cactus body are a defense against herbivory. Rarely a mature barrel cactus is found hollowed out by javelina but overall prickly pear experience much higher levels of damage from more species. Barrel cactus spines pose an extreme hazard for handling, penetrating boots and gloves. The roots are quite long but very shallow.

Distribution
The fishhook barrel cactus is native to southwestern United States and northwestern Mexico.  More specifically, it can be found in southern Arizona, southern New Mexico, El Paso County, Texas and northern Sonora and Chihuahua, Mexico. It grows in gravelly or sandy soil, more commonly on bajadas than steep slopes, at 1000 to 5300 feet (300–1600 m) elevation. It prefers full sun, and does well in hot arid climates. It is, however, frost-tolerant to 5 °F (-15 °C)

Ecology
The flowers are pollinated by cactus bees (Lithurge spp.).  Mule deer, birds, and javelina eat the fruit.  The birds especially like the seeds.  The people of the Sonoran Desert use the fruit for candy and jelly. The Seri and O'odham eat the flowers and use the fruit, which is sour, as emergency food. Tradition says that the barrel cactus is a source of water for people lost without water in the desert.  There are records of the southwestern Native Americans using it for that purpose, but the water contains oxalic acid and is likely to cause diarrhea if ingested on an empty stomach.

The skin thickens with age, making older cacti more fire resistant. Even so, average mortality due to fire is 50 to 67 percent within the first two years following fire.

In urban areas, the Fishhook Barrel is valued as an ornamental plant.  It is drought tolerant and good for xeriscaping, and it is also a low-maintenance full-sun plant.

Gallery

References

External links

Fishhook Barrel Cactus Pictures at BioImages.
Fishhook Barrel Cactus Pictures at CalPhotos
Map of Fishhook Barrel Cactus range
USDA: NRCS Plants Profile Ferocactus wislizeni
Ferocactus wislizeni at Flora of North America; RangeMap

wislizeni
Cacti of Mexico
Cacti of the United States
Flora of the Chihuahuan Desert
Flora of Arizona
Flora of New Mexico
Flora of Sonora
Flora of Chihuahua (state)
Flora of Northwestern Mexico
Flora of the Rio Grande valleys
North American desert flora
Plants used in Native American cuisine
Garden plants of North America